Monan Park is a 500-seat baseball stadium located in Boston, Massachusetts, on Columbia Point. Monan Park is jointly owned by Boston College High School and the University of Massachusetts Boston. When it opened in the spring of 2016, it immediately became the home of both schools' baseball programs. Monan Park features the same outfield dimensions as Fenway Park and features a similar Green Monster in left-field.

The Boston College High School Eagles are members of the Catholic Conference and compete at the Division 1 level of the MIAA. The UMass Boston Beacons are members of the Little East Conference of the NCAA Division III.

History 
Athletes from both Boston College High School and the University of Massachusetts Boston gathered for the ceremonial groundbreaking on June 11, 2015. The complex is named after former Boston College president and chancellor J. Donald Monan, SJ.

Before the construction of Monan Park, the UMass Boston Beacons had to play their home games at Campanelli Stadium in Brockton, Massachusetts to meet the NCAA Division III site requirements. Monan Park marks the first time in UMass Boston's program history that they will have a home field. UMass Boston hosted MIT in the first game at Monan Park, which they won by a score of 4–0 in front of a crowd of 155.

The project was anchored by a $2 million donation from the Yawkey Foundation. In addition to the baseball stadium, there is a secondary multipurpose field used for baseball, soccer, and lacrosse.

Monan Park has been the home of the Bay State Games baseball tournament every summer since 2016. Monan Park has hosted the Little East Conference baseball tournament twice since its opening. The park was the host in its inaugural season and was host again in 2018, which UMass Boston won. In 2019, it was host to the NCAA Division III Baseball Tournament Regional and Super Regional. In Game 3 of the 2019 Super Regional, Monan Park set its record attendance of 379, as UMass Boston won 6–2 to advance to the Division III College World Series.

In June 2019, Monan Park hosted a neutral-site Cape Cod Baseball League game between the Wareham Gatemen and Yarmouth-Dennis Red Sox.

Access and transportation 
 Monan Park can be reached by the Massachusetts Bay Transportation Authority (MBTA) Red Line subway's JFK/UMass station. This station also serves the commuter rail's Greenbush Line and Old Colony Lines.

See also 

 Fenway Park
 List of U.S. baseball stadiums by capacity

References 

2016 establishments in Massachusetts
Baseball venues in Boston
Catholic Conference (MIAA)
College baseball venues in the United States
Columbia Point, Boston
High school baseball venues in the United States
UMass–Boston Beacons baseball
Sports venues completed in 2016